Frederick Thomas Russell (20 August 1890 – 23 December 1972) was a New Zealand lawn bowls player. At the 1950 British Empire Games in Auckland, he won the men's fours bronze medal alongside teammates Arthur Engebretsen, Noel Jolly and Pete Skoglund. The New Zealand, Australian and South African fours each finished the round robin with two wins, but New Zealand then lost an eliminator match against the South Africans and did not progress to the final.

Russell was born on 20 August 1890, the son of Alexander and Emily Russell, and died on 23 December 1972. He was buried at Karori Cemetery. A builder by trade, he was a member of the Hataitai Bowling Club in Wellington.

References

1890 births
1972 deaths
Sportspeople from Wellington City
New Zealand male bowls players
Commonwealth Games bronze medallists for New Zealand
Bowls players at the 1950 British Empire Games
Commonwealth Games medallists in lawn bowls
Burials at Karori Cemetery
19th-century New Zealand people
20th-century New Zealand people
Medallists at the 1950 British Empire Games